Milton Aguilar (born 2 March 1984, in Mexico City) is a Mexican former goalkeeper for Alacranes de Durango.

Club career
He used to be the third goalkeeper at Club América, after Guillermo Ochoa and Armando Navarrete. Milton used to play for the Primera A (2nd Division) team of Club América, Socio Aguila

References

External links
''Source: https://web.archive.org/web/20080529050145/http://www.esmas.com/clubamerica/nuestroequipo/650917.html

Living people
1984 births
Footballers from Mexico City
Association football goalkeepers
Club América footballers
Santos Laguna footballers
Alacranes de Durango footballers
Mexican footballers